In Judo, improvement and understanding of the art is denoted by a system of rankings split into kyū and dan grades. These are indicated with various systems of coloured belts, with the black belt indicating a practitioner who has attained a certain level of competence.

The Kōdōkan Kyū-Dan ranking system

 are ranked according to their skill and knowledge, and, for later dan grades, their contribution to the art. Their rank is indicated by the colour of belt that they wear.

This ranking system was introduced by Kanō Jigorō, the founder of judo, in 1883. However, the current system is not the original one, but based on Kanō's last system introduced between 1926-1931, with some modification shortly after Kanō's death in 1938. The first dan grades were awarded to his students Saigō Shirō and Tomita Tsunejirō. Since then it has been widely adopted by other modern martial arts.

In the current system as in use in Japan, there are six student grades ranked in descending numerical order. This they wore through .

1st kyū is the last kyū rank before promotion to first degree black belt (shodan). There are (in practice) 10 dan ranks, which are ranked in ascending numerical order.

Highest ranking jūdōka

Kōdōkan-graded jūdan holders
The ninth (kudan) and tenth degree black belt (jūdan) and, theoretically, those higher, have no formal requirements.  Only 15 individuals have been promoted to the rank of Kōdōkan 10th dan.  On January 6, 2006, three individuals were promoted to this rank simultaneously: Daigo Toshirō, Ichirō Abe, and Ōsawa Yoshimi. This is the most ever at the same time, and the first in 22 years. No one has ever been promoted to a rank higher than 10th dan, but in theory the Judo rank system is not limited to 10 degrees of black belt. As an educator by profession, Kanō believed that there should be no end to an individual's learning, and therefore no limit to the number of dan ranks. The English language edition (1955) of Illustrated Kodokan Judo, edited by the Kōdōkan, says:

This statement was later clarified, however. Essentially, the dan-rank system was capped at 10 after the death of Kanō. In that respect, in the November 1963 issue of Jūdō, the Kōdōkan's official magazine, the Kōdōkan responding to the question "Do the 11th and 12th Dan really exist?" *clarifies that the hierarchy now stops at 10 and that the Kōdōkan does not envisage any nominations to these grades.

There have only been fifteen 10th dan promotions awarded by the Kōdōkan itself in the history of Judo.

Variations in rank structure

Although dan ranks tend to be consistent between national organizations there is more variation in the kyū grades, with some countries having more kyū grades. Although initially kyū grade belt colours were uniformly white, today a variety of colours are used. The first black belts to denote a Dan rank in the 1880s. Initially the wide obi was used; as practitioners trained in kimono, only white and black obi were used. It was not until the early 1900s, after the introduction of the judogi, that an expanded colored belt system of awarding rank was created.

Belt colors

For dan ranks, the first five are colored black, 6th, 7th, and 8th dan have alternating red and white panels (段だら,dandara), and for 9th, 10th dan and above, the belts are solid red. In judo's promotion system as originally finalized by Kanō around 1926 there was no maximal dan rank, and judoka holding 10th dan (and above) would normally wear a red belt, but also could wear a white belt (the same color as the lowest kyū rank), or a black belt. However, since the highest dan rank reached in judo for a living person or conferred posthumously remains 10th dan, any judo dan rank higher than 10th dan is now considered as a merely historical theoretical option. Some time after the death of Kanō the promotion system essentially became capped at 10th dan. Furthermore, holders of a dan rank above godan (5th dan) will often wear a plain black belt during regular training practice and outside any ceremonial duties.

Examination requirements vary depending on country, age group and of course the grade being attempted. The examination itself may include competition and kata. The kyū ranks are normally awarded by local instructors (sensei), but dan ranks are usually awarded only after an exam supervised by independent judges from a national judo association. For a rank to be recognized, it must be registered with the national judo organization or the Kōdōkan.

Japan
In Japan, the use of belt colors is related to the age of the student. Some clubs will only have black and white, others will include a brown belt for advanced kyū grades and at the elementary school level it is common to see a green belt for intermediate levels.

Europe
In Europe the belt system is white, yellow, orange, green, blue, brown and black for both senior and junior practitioners. Judokas who have attained the 6th Dan may also use a red-white paneled belt, and judokas who have attained the 9th Dan may wear a solid red belt. In some countries a red belt is used between the white and yellow belts to signify full membership of the judo club or the country's judo association. More commonly, however, the red belt is reserved only for 9th and 10th Dan practitioners.

In some countries junior practitioners have an extra system in place to show the progress in between two kyū grades. The sub rank is symbolized by a small piece of fabric on the end of the belt. The colour of these are yellow, orange, green, blue or, brown. The piece added to the belt can never be of a lower or the same colour as the belt worn by the judoka, so an orange belt can’t have a yellow piece, but it can have green, blue or, brown.

In other countries, such as Finland, junior sub ranks below a certain age are denoted by one to three red stripes on both ends of the belt. They are also used to signify that joint locks, chokes or strangles may not be performed upon the wearer as those are not taught nor applied to juniors below the age of 15 due to safety reasons.

Israel

In Israel the following belt colors exist:

Brazil

Brazilian belt rankings are normally white, grey, blue, yellow, orange, green, purple, brown and black (6th, 7th, and 8th dan may wear alternating red and white panels, and 9th and 10th dan holders may wear solid red belts). As in some European countries, young judoka in Brazil have an extra system in place to show the progress in between two kyū grades. The sub rank exists between white and orange belts and is symbolized by the ends of the current belt being the color of the next rank.

Canada
In Canada belt rankings for Seniors are, in ascending order: white, yellow, orange, green, blue, brown and finally black. Belt rankings for Juniors use, white, white-yellow, yellow, yellow-orange, orange, orange-green, green, green-blue, blue, blue-brown, and brown.

Australia
In Australia belt rankings for Seniors are, in ascending order: white, yellow, orange, green, blue, brown and finally black. Belt rankings for Juniors follow the same ranks and colours (up to and including brown), but have either 1, 2 or 3 white bars (depending upon age) at each end of the belt, as follows:
If the judoka is aged up to 10 (Mon), there are to be 3 white bars.
Between 10 and 13 (Yonen), there are 2 bars.
Finally, for 13 to 16 years of age (Shonen), there is a single bar.

Ireland
In Ireland the senior belt system is white, yellow, orange, green, blue, brown and black. A practitioner must be at least sixteen before being eligible to grade for blackbelt. For white, yellow, orange and green belt gradings are held in the practitioners club and are based on demonstration of a syllabus and kata. For promotion to blue and brown the judoka must compete at a national grading against players of their own rank and win at least two fights by ippon or wazari. To achieve black belt a judoka must earn 100 points i.e. 10 points for every ippon or waza-ari victory against a brown belt.

United Kingdom
In the United Kingdom, the British Judo Association Kyu Grade system is as follows:

 Novice - white belt
 6th Kyu - red belt
 5th Kyu - yellow belt
 4th Kyu - orange belt
 3rd Kyu - green belt
 2nd Kyu - blue belt
 1st Kyu - brown belt

A practitioner must be at least fifteen before being eligible to grade for black belt.

United States

In the United States only senior players (usually those age 16 and over) are allowed to earn dan levels, signified by wearing a black belt. The United States Judo Federation (USJF) and United States Judo Association (USJA) recognize dan grades awarded by the other organization.  Advanced kyū levels can be earned by both seniors and juniors (children under the age of about 16) and are signified by wearing belts of various colours other than black.  The order of belt colours can vary from dōjō to dōjō, depending on the dōjō's organizational affiliation.

Seniors
For senior players, both the USJF and the USJA specify six kyū, as listed in the table. The USJA requires "Beginners" (not a kyū) to wear a white belt until they test for yellow belt. The USJA also recommends wearing a patch specifying the practitioner's level. This is true for both kyū and dan levels.

Juniors
The USJF Juniors ranking system specifies ranks to 11th kyū (jūichikyū). The USJA Juniors ranking system specifies twelve levels of kyū rank, beginning with "Junior 1st Degree" (equivalent to jūnikyū, or 12th kyū) and ending with "Junior 12th Degree" (equivalent to ikkyū). As with the senior practitioners, the USJA recommends that juniors wear a patch specifying their rank.
When a USJA Junior reaches the age of 17, their conversion to Senior rank is:

 Yellow belt converts to 6th kyū (rokkyū)
 Orange belt converts to 5th kyū (gokyū)
 Green belt converts to 4th kyū (yonkyū)
 Blue belt or higher converts to 3rd kyū (sankyū)

References

Judo
Titles and rank in Japanese martial arts
Martial arts ranking